Alleyn Court Prep School is a co-educational day preparatory school in Westcliff-on-Sea, Essex for children up to age 11.

History
The school was founded in 1904 by Theodore Wilcox and first opened in September of that year. It was owned by the Wilcox family until 2015, when it was handed to a charitable trust. For many years boys could be seen in bright pink caps and ties. The school moved to a new location in Southchurch Lawn in 1992 and the pre-prep school now uses parts of the old school in Westcliff.

Reputation
According to the Independent Schools Council, the school "has high academic standards and an excellent reputation for sport and creative and performing arts." It also states that children "progress mostly to local grammar schools after 11+, with some also going to local Senior Independent Schools."

Notable alumni
 Trevor Bailey, cricketer, cricket writer and broadcaster
 James Bourne, musician from Busted
 Baron Chelmer, Joint Treasurer of the Conservative party, 1965-1977
 Dick Clement, co-screenwriter for television series including The Likely Lads, Whatever Happened to the Likely Lads?, Porridge, Lovejoy and Auf Wiedersehen, Pet
 Sir Kenneth Cork, Lord Mayor of London, 1978–1979
 Mark Foster,  world record 50 metre swimmer
 John Fowles, writer, works include The Magus and The French Lieutenant's Woman
 Jerry Hayes, Conservative politician, MP for Harlow in Essex, 1983-1997
 Stewart Robson, Arsenal, West Ham and Coventry footballer; now football writer

References

External links
School website

Private schools in Southend-on-Sea
Preparatory schools in Essex